Statistics of Japan Football League in the 1995 season.

Overview
It was contested by 16 teams, and Fukuoka Blux won the championship. They were promoted to the J.League along with Kyoto Purple Sanga.

Newly promoted before the season were Brummell Sendai (the future Vegalta Sendai), and Fukushima FC, which despite its name was based in Kōriyama.

League table

References

1996
2
Japan
Japan